Upsala may refer to several places:

Upsala Glacier, a glacier in Argentina
Upsala, Ontario, a township in Canada
Upsala, Minnesota, a city in United States
Upsala (mansion), a historic mansion in Pennsylvania, United States
Upsala College, a defunct private college in New Jersey, United States
New Upsala, Wisconsin, a former Swedish-American settlement in Wisconsin, United States
Upsala (Gausantė), rivulet in Lithuania, tributary of Gausantė in Mituva basin

See also
 Uppsala, a city in Sweden
 Uppsala (disambiguation)